The First Gentlemen/Lady of Slovenia (Slovene language: Prva dama Slovenije) is the title attributed to the wife/husband or domestic partner of the President of Slovenia. 
 
There has been one First Gentleman of Slovenia so far - Aleš Musar, whose wife is President Nataša Pirc Musar since 22 December 2022.

Benefits

By law, the spouses or domestic partners of the President of Slovenia, known as the First Lady or First Gentleman, have equal rights and obligations within the position, whether they are married to the president or not. This equality was codified by an amendment to the Marriage and Family Relations Act, which stipulates that marriage and cohabitation are considered equal by the government.

The spouse or partner of the President of Slovenia is entitled to paid leave from work for official functions and other responsibilities. The first lady (or first gentleman) receives an official monthly allowance of 15 percent of the President's salary, (the equivalent of about 890.73 euros in 2017), from the government to cover the cost of these obligations.

The first lady may also elect to leave her employer during the duration of their term in office. In this case, she is entitled to an official monthly allowance of 20 percent of the president's salary.

In January 2013, First Lady Tanja Pečar, the partner of President Borut Pahor, announced that she would renounce her financial privileges as first lady and refrain from receiving a monthly allowance. Instead, Pečar chose to remain an active lawyer during her tenure, while still performing the protocols and social obligations that are required of the first lady.

List of first ladies

References

Slovenia
Slovenian women in politics